David Spangler (December 2, 1796 – October 18, 1856) was an American lawyer and politician who served two terms as a U.S. Representative from Ohio from 1833 to 1837.

Biography 
Born in Sharpsburg, Maryland, Spangler moved with his parents to Zanesville, Ohio in 1802. He attended public schools and worked at the blacksmith's trade before engaging in mercantile pursuits. Spangler then studied law and was admitted to the bar in 1824. He commenced practice in Zanesville.

He was an unsuccessful candidate for election to the state house of representatives in 1830. He then moved to Coshocton, Ohio in 1832 and continued to practice law. Spangler was elected as an Anti-Jacksonian to the Twenty-third and Twenty-fourth Congresses (March 4, 1833 – March 3, 1837). He declined candidacy for renomination in 1836 and for the nomination for Governor of Ohio in 1844.

Death
Spangler died in Coshocton on October 18, 1856 and was interred in South Lawn Cemetery.

Sources

External links

 

1796 births
1856 deaths
People from Washington County, Maryland
19th-century American politicians
People from Coshocton, Ohio
Politicians from Zanesville, Ohio
National Republican Party members of the United States House of Representatives from Ohio